The women's 200 metres at the 2009 World Championships in Athletics was held at the Olympic Stadium on 19, 20 and 21 August.

Olympic silver medalist and defending World champion Allyson Felix (USA) established herself as the pre-race favorite, having run under 22 seconds earlier in the season. Double Olympic champion Veronica Campbell-Brown (JAM) suffered a toe injury and entered Berlin below her peak form.

In the final, Campbell-Brown and Allyson Felix both went out of the blocks quickly and entered the home straight even with one another. Felix, however, was able to hold her form as Campbell-Brown faltered, crossing the line in 22.02 seconds to win her third World 200m title. Campbell-Brown earned another silver medal in the 200m, and Debbie Ferguson-McKenzie (BAH) won the bronze medal.

Medalists

Records

Qualification standards

Schedule

Results

Heats
Qualification: First 3 in each heat (Q) and the next 6 fastest (q) advance to the semifinals.

Key:  PB = Personal best, Q = qualification by place in heat, q = qualification by overall place, SB = Seasonal best

Semifinals
Qualification: First 2 in each semifinal (Q) and the next 2 fastest (q) advance to the final.

Final

References
General
Specific

200 metres
200 metres at the World Athletics Championships
2009 in women's athletics